Lacera procellosa is a moth of the family Erebidae. It is found from Japan and the Oriental tropics (China (Tibet, Qinghai), Korea, India (Assam, Meghalaya, Sikkim), Sri Lanka, Nepal, Thailand, Cambodia, Vietnam, Taiwan) to the Philippines (Luzon), Sumatra, Sulawesi, Sumbawa, Java, Lombok and New Guinea.

The wingspan is 26–28 mm.

The larvae feed on Gleditsia and possibly Caesalpinia species. They are leaf-green, with a pair of dull yellow tubercles and numerous scattered white dots.

References

Moths described in 1879
Lacera